Gaji Gudana  is a village in Kapurthala district of Punjab State, India. The village is administrated by a Sarpanch, who is an elected representative.

Demography 
According to the report published by Census India in 2011, Gaji Gudana has a total number of 77 houses and population of 400  of which include 197 males and 203 females. Literacy rate of Gaji Gudana is 75.74%, lower than state average of 75.84%.  The population of children under the age of 6 years is 29 which is 7.25% of total population of Gaji Gudana, and child sex ratio is approximately  1071, higher than state average of 846.

Population data

Air travel connectivity 
The closest airport to the village is Sri Guru Ram Dass Jee International Airport.

Villages in Kapurthala

External links
  Villages in Kapurthala
 Kapurthala Villages List

References

Villages in Kapurthala district